Ellis Amdur (born March 27, 1952 in Pittsburgh, Pennsylvania) is a writer, an American practitioner of martial arts and a crisis intervention trainer. He has published a number of books on martial arts, on crisis intervention, hostage negotiation, and fiction.

Career
Amdur began his study of martial arts in 1968, learning karate and traditional Chinese arts. He started training in aikido in 1973, and after moving to New York, lived in Terry Dobson and Ken Nisson’s Bond Street Dojo. He also started training daily at Yamada Yoshimitsu's New York Aikikai school of aikido. After gaining a degree in psychology, Amdur traveled to Japan in 1976 to further his study of the martial arts, and while there, entered the Tenshin Bukō-ryū Heihō and Araki-ryū, two traditional koryu. He is shihan (full instructor) in both these arts, one of only a few non-Japanese to attain teaching licenses in any koryu. He has also studied judo, Muay Thai and xingyiquan. In recent years, Amdur has continued his training in several areas: an in-depth study of 'internal strength' paradigms, as suited to use within traditional Japanese combative arts; Arrestling, a mixed martial art specifically for law enforcement, created by Don Gulla; Amdur's 'new-old' development, Taikyoku Araki-ryu in which, in collaboration with established groups of expert martial artists, one or more 'modules' of Araki-ryu are studied in depth, and applied to the environment where the particular group functions (competitive grappling and law enforcement being two examples).

Based in Seattle, Amdur teaches courses for a variety of different venues, from law enforcement and corrections to mental health and families on crisis intervention.

Works
Amdur is the author of several books on the martial arts (Dueling With O-Sensei, Hidden in Plain Sight, Old School) as well as thirteen profession-specific books on crisis intervention and mental health which are published under his own Edgework Publishing imprint. In addition, he has also published:
 Shapeshifting: Effective Scenario Training for Crisis/Hostage Negotiation Teams - two separate works: one for law enforcement & one for HNT teams in prison environments.
 Along with Evelyn Amdur & Shelley R. Amdur, he has published FINAL CHAPTERS: A Hospice Social Worker’s Stories of Courage, Heart and Power
 Body and Soul: Toward a Radical Intersubjectivity in Psychotherapy - a book combining phenomenological psychology and clinical encounters with people struggling to survive in desperate circumstances
 The Coordinator: Managing High-Risk, High-Consequence Social Interactions in an Unfamiliar Environment
 The Accord Agent: Managing Intense, Highly Problematic Social Interactions within a Business Environment
 Girl with the Face of the Moon - A novel
 Lost Boy - A novel
 Along with Neal Stephenson, Charles C. Mann, and Mark Teppo, he has also published a graphic novel, entitled Cimarronin.

References

Martial arts writers
1952 births
Living people
American martial artists
Ko-ryū bujutsu